Johann Theodor Roemhildt (1684–1756) was a German Baroque composer born in Salzungen. As a child, he studied in Ruhla with Johann Jacob Bach; and from age thirteen on at St. Thomas' School, Leipzig under Johann Schelle and Johann Kuhnau. His fellow students included Christoph Graupner, Johann Friedrich Fasch and Johann David Heinichen.

Roemhildt was court kapellmeister to Heinrich Duke of Saxony (1661–1738) at Merseburg, where he later died.

Works, editions and recordings
236 of Roemhildt's cantatas survive, 50 of which are solo cantatas, along with a St. Matthew Passion.
Cantatas Es geht kein andrer Weg zum Himmel and Meine Sonne stehet stille Klaus Mertens, Accademia Daniel, dir Shalev Ad-El, 2007.
Cantatas 'Kommt, Ihr Herzen, kommt ihr Lippen' and 'Nun danket alle Gott', in "Christmas Cantatas of 18th Century Danzig": Goldberg Baroque Ensemble, dir Andrejz Mikolaj Szadejko; Kantaty Bozonarodzeniowe; Sarton Records, Warsaw, 2010

References

1684 births
1756 deaths
People from Bad Salzungen
German Baroque composers
18th-century classical composers
German male classical composers
18th-century German composers
18th-century German male musicians